Handy, Indiana may refer to:

Handy, Benton County, Indiana, an unincorporated community
Handy, Monroe County, Indiana, an unincorporated community in Perry Township